The Clerk's House is an historic building in Shoreditch, England. Standing at 118½ Shoreditch High Street, it is a Grade II listed building dating to 1735. It is two storeys, plus an attic and a basement. Part of its interior, such as some wood panelling, dates to the 16th century.

Believed to have formerly been a watch house, from which somebody looked out for body snatchers in the adjacent St Leonard's churchyard, the ground floor is now a business, while the upper floors remain residential.

References 

Shoreditch

Grade II listed houses in London
Houses completed in 1735